4-Hydroxyestrone (4-OHE1), also known as estra-1,3,5(10)-triene-3,4-diol-17-one, is an endogenous, naturally occurring catechol estrogen and a minor metabolite of estrone and estradiol. It is estrogenic, similarly to many other hydroxylated estrogen metabolites such as 2-hydroxyestradiol, 16α-hydroxyestrone, estriol (16α-hydroxyestradiol), and 4-hydroxyestradiol but unlike 2-hydroxyestrone.

See also
 Estrogen conjugate
 Lipoidal estradiol

References

External links
 Metabocard for 4-Hydroxyestrone - Human Metabolome Database

Diols
Estranes
Estrogens
Human metabolites